Mechnikov is an impact crater on the far side of the Moon. It is located just to the northeast of the much larger walled plain Galois, being separated by a stretch of irregular terrain about 20–30 km in width.

This is a roughly circular crater that has undergone a moderate amount of impact erosion, but is still relatively intact. Attached to the exterior along the northeast are the satellite craters Mechnikov C and Mechnikov D. There is a small crater in the western part of Mechnikov's interior floor.

A small crater along the northeast rim of Galois has a small ray system. Ray material from this crater crosses the interior of Mechnikov in a series of streaks that are radial to the impact, producing a fan-like appearance.

Satellite craters
By convention these features are identified on lunar maps by placing the letter on the side of the crater midpoint that is closest to Mechnikov.

References

 
 
 
 
 
 
 
 
 
 
 
 

Impact craters on the Moon